Tris(4-methoxyphenyl)phosphine is the organophosphorus compound  with the formula (CH3OC6H4)3P.  Several isomers of this formula are known, but the symmetrical derivative with methoxy groups in the 4-position is most studied.  The compound is used as a ligand in organometallic chemistry and homogeneous catalysis.

Related ligands
Triphenylphosphine
2-(Diphenylphosphino)anisole

References

Tertiary phosphines
Phenyl compounds
Benzene derivatives